Henri Safran (born 7 October 1932) is a Paris-born director who worked extensively in Australia. He worked in French television, then in Britain, before moving to Australia in 1960 to work with the ABC. He became an Australian citizen in 1963 but returned to England in 1966 to work on British television. He returned to Australia again in the mid-1970s.

Select credits
Jenny (1962) (TV movie)
A Season in Hell (1964) (TV movie)
A Sound of Trumpets (1964) (TV movie)
Storm Boy (1976)
Listen to the Lion (1977)
Golden Soak (1979) (mini-series)
Norman Loves Rose (1982)
Bush Christmas (1983)
The Edge of Power (1987)
The Rogue Stallion (1990)
Flair (1990) (mini-series)

References

External links

Australian film directors
1932 births
Living people
French emigrants to Australia
Naturalised citizens of Australia